Jon Peterson may refer to:

 Jon Peterson (politician), member of the Ohio House of Representatives
 Jon Peterson (artist) (born 1945), American artist